The Government Degree College, Kelam  (also known as GDC Kelam or Inspector Shri Muhammad Altaf Dar Degree College) is a co-education college located in Kelam, Kulgam in the Indian union territory of Jammu and Kashmir. The college was established in 2008 and is affiliated with Kashmir University. The college is recognized by University Grants Commission.

Location 

Courses offered
The college offers Arts and Science streams.

References

Degree colleges in Kashmir Division
Universities and colleges in Jammu and Kashmir
Colleges affiliated to University of Kashmir
2008 establishments in Jammu and Kashmir
Educational institutions established in 2008